Henry Barnard (1811–1900) was an American educationalist.

Henry Barnard may also refer to:

Henry C. Barnard (1837–?), Wisconsin legislator
Mike Barnard (sportsman, born 1933) (Henry Michael Barnard, born 1933), English cricketer and footballer
Henry Watson Barnard (1792–1855), English cricketer
Henry William Barnard (1799–1857), British lieutenant-general

See also

Harry Bernard (1878–1940), American actor and comedian